Forgotten Women  is a 1949 American drama film directed by William Beaudine and starring Elyse Knox, Edward Norris and Robert Shayne. The film follows the lives and romantic entanglements of three women who frequent a bar.

Plot

Cast
 Elyse Knox as Kate Allison 
 Edward Norris as Andy Emerson 
 Robert Shayne as Richard Marshall 
 Theodora Lynch as Ruth Marshall 
 Veda Ann Borg as Clair Dunning 
 Noel Neill as Ellen Reid 
 Tim Ryan as Harry 
 Bill Kennedy as Bill Dunning 
 Warren Douglas as John Allison 
 Selmer Jackson as Judge Donnell 
 Paul Frison as Gary

References

Bibliography
 The American Film Institute Catalog of Motion Pictures Produced in the United States: Feature Films, 1941 - 1950: Feature Films. University of California Press, 1999.

External links

1949 films
American drama films
American black-and-white films
1949 drama films
Films directed by William Beaudine
Monogram Pictures films
1940s English-language films
1940s American films